Rugby league nines at the 2007 Pacific Games was held from 5–6 September 2007 at Marist St. Joseph's Stadium. Fiji won the gold medal, defeating the Cook Islands in the final by 14–0. Hosts Samoa took the bronze medal, defeating Tonga by 20–10 in the third place match.

Results

Pool A

Pool B

5th place play off

Semi-finals

Final standings

References

External links
 News on Official webpage

2007 South Pacific Games
2007
2007 in rugby league
Rugby league nines